, also known as Another Battle, is a 2000 Japanese yakuza film directed by Junji Sakamoto. It is a remake of Kinji Fukasaku's Battles Without Honor and Humanity series from the 1970s, which were adapted from a series of newspaper articles by journalist Kōichi Iiboshi, that were rewrites of a manuscript originally written by real-life yakuza Kōzō Minō while he was in prison.

Rock musician Tomoyasu Hotei, who plays Tochino Masatatsu, wrote the soundtrack to the film. Its title piece would be reworked and retitled "Battle Without Honor or Humanity" and go on to become a hit both in Japan and internationally. The film was followed by New Battles Without Honor and Humanity/Murder, or Another Battle/Conspiracy, directed by Hajime Hashimoto in 2003.

Synopsis
While the film is a remake of the original Battles Without Honor and Humanity series, it has no direct similarities. Set in Osaka, it focuses on former childhood friends Kadoya Kaneo (Etsushi Toyokawa) and Tochino Masatatsu (Tomoyasu Hotei) as their lives cross paths again. Kaneo is now a yakuza member, while Masatatsu is a nightclub owner with a distaste for crime gangs. When a yakuza boss dies, a struggle for his position takes place between Kaneo's boss Awano (Ittoku Kishibe) and the young Nakahira (Kōichi Satō). Nakahira's men try to extort money from Masatatsu, bringing him in between a yakuza battle.

Cast
 Etsushi Toyokawa as Kadoya Kaneo
 Tomoyasu Hotei as Tochino Masatatsu
 Shō Aikawa
 Ittoku Kishibe as Awano
 Kōichi Satō as Nakahira
 Seizō Fukumoto
 Shigeki Terao
 Junkichi Orimoto as Mizoguchi Takeo

Awards
2000 Nikkan Sports Film Award for Best Director - Junji Sakamoto
2001 Japan Academy Prize for Newcomer of the Year - Tomoyasu Hotei
2001 Yokohama Film Festival Award for Best Supporting Actor - Jun Murakami
2001 Kinema Junpo Award for Best Director - Junji Sakamoto

Soundtrack

The soundtrack to the film was composed and performed by Tomoyasu Hotei, who plays Tochino Masatatsu, with the London Session Orchestra also performing on several tracks. The first track is the theme of the original 1970's series, composed by Toshiaki Tsushima, while the second is Hotei's version of the same song, which would later be re-titled "Battle Without Honor or Humanity" and become internationally known. The soundtrack peaked at number 41 on the Oricon chart, while "Born to Be Free", which was released as a single earlier in the year, reached number 14.

Track listing

References

External links
 
 New Battles Without Honor and Humanity  at the Japanese Movie Database

2000 films
Yakuza films
Toei Company films
2000s Japanese-language films
2000s Japanese films
2000 crime drama films
Japanese crime drama films